Hybodera debilis is a species of beetle in the family Cerambycidae. It was described by John Lawrence LeConte in 1874.

References

Hyboderini
Beetles described in 1874